The Greatest 33 is a list of top drivers from the history of the Indianapolis 500. In 2011, in celebration of the 100th anniversary of the first Indianapolis 500, the Indianapolis Motor Speedway gathered a panel of media and historians to establish 100 nominees for the best drivers who have participated in the Indianapolis 500 from 1911 to 2010. During the months leading up the race, fans were invited to vote on the best 33 among the nominees, and the finalists were announced in the days leading up to the 2011 race.

The selection of 33 drivers reflects the traditional 33 starters that comprise the field for the Indianapolis 500 annually.

Selection process
Of the 732 drivers who had participated in the Indianapolis 500 from 1911 to 2010, a list of 100 nominees was narrowed down by a panel of experts. The criteria were somewhat loose, as winning the race was not necessarily a requirement for inclusion. At the time, only 68 drivers had won the race, and of those, only 57 were nominated. Other factors that were weighed included: pole position winners, lap leaders, rookies of the year, individual statistical accomplishments, accomplishments of a historical nature, and popular fixtures.

The original list of 100 drivers was released on March 18, and voting continued through May 14.

The final list of 33 drivers was announced May 15. The three four-time Indy 500 winners A. J. Foyt, Al Unser Sr., and Rick Mears comprised the front row. The three most recent three-time winners Bobby Unser, Johnny Rutherford, and Hélio Castroneves, made up the second row. Three non-winners, Tony Bettenhausen Sr., Dan Gurney, and Michael Andretti, were selected, although Gurney and Andretti are former race-winning owners, and both had second-place finishes in their careers. Ray Harroun, winner of the inaugural race was situated in row nine, alongside Tommy Milton, the first-ever two-time winner.

All 17 of the multiple Indy 500 winners going into the 2011 race were included on the list. Of the thirty-three finalists, twenty-one were living at the time the list was released. Only four drivers (Castroneves, Franchitti, Dixon, and Montoya) on the list were considered active in professional-level motorsports at the time.

Grid

Nominees

Fred Agabashian
Marco Andretti
Mario Andretti
Michael Andretti
Billy Arnold
Cliff Bergere
Gary Bettenhausen
Tony Bettenhausen Sr.
Johnny Boyd
Joe Boyer
Jimmy Bryan
Hélio Castroneves
Eddie Cheever Jr.
Jim Clark
Art Cross
Bill Cummings
Gil de Ferran
Ralph DePalma
Pete DePaolo
Scott Dixon
Mark Donohue
Emerson Fittipaldi
Pat Flaherty
A. J. Foyt
Fred Frame
Dario Franchitti
Scott Goodyear
Robby Gordon
Jules Goux
Roberto Guerrero
Dan Gurney
Janet Guthrie
Sam Hanks
Ray Harroun
Harry Hartz
Ralph Hepburn
Graham Hill
Bill Holland
Ted Horn
Sam Hornish Jr.
Jim Hurtubise
Gordon Johncock
Parnelli Jones
Tony Kanaan
Ray Keech
Mel Kenyon
Buddy Lazier
Joe Leonard
Frank Lockhart
Arie Luyendyk
Bobby Marshman
Rex Mays
Roger McCluskey
Jim McElreath
Jack McGrath
Rick Mears
Vítor Meira
Louis Meyer
Chet Miller
Tommy Milton
Juan Pablo Montoya
Mike Mosley
Ralph Mulford
Jimmy Murphy
Duke Nalon
Pat O'Connor
Barney Oldfield
Danny Ongais
Johnnie Parsons
Danica Patrick
Bobby Rahal
Jim Rathmann
Dario Resta
Peter Revson
Mauri Rose
Lloyd Ruby
Johnny Rutherford
Troy Ruttman
Eddie Sachs
Wilbur Shaw
Tom Sneva
Jimmy Snyder
George Souders
Jackie Stewart
Tony Stewart
Danny Sullivan
Bob Sweikert
René Thomas
Johnny Thomson
Paul Tracy
Al Unser Sr.
Al Unser Jr.
Bobby Unser
Jacques Villeneuve
Bill Vukovich
Bill Vukovich II
Lee Wallard
Rodger Ward
Dan Wheldon
Howdy Wilcox

Reaction
Immediately after the list was released, critical reaction was both positive and negative. There was almost universal acclaim for the three four-time winners being on the front row (Foyt, Unser, Mears). However, there was considerable dissent regarding winners that were not included, bias towards recent years, and the inclusion of non-winners. Due to the limitations of the final list size (33 names), it was not possible for all 68 former winners to be included. Also, significant non-winners such as Rex Mays and Ted Horn were not included in the final grid.

There were several dissents early on among fans and media regarding drivers included on the original list of 100 finalists, such as Danica Patrick and Marco Andretti. However, none of the highly controversial nominees made the final official list. Dan Wheldon (who at the time of voting had won only once) won the race for the second time just days after the list was released. Along with four other top-4 career finishes, and three front row starts, considerable speculation afterwards suggested Wheldon would have made easily the list had the voting been conducted after the race.

After the official announcement, merchandise including T-shirts and other collectibles, were marketed in The Greatest 33 theme.

Gallery
The top three vote-getters consisted of the three four-time Indianapolis 500 winners.

External links
The Greatest 33 - Official Site
Greatest 33 drivers in Indy 500 history - Photo Gallery, IndyStar.com

References

Pole-sitters